Dato' Muhammad Azizulhasni bin Awang  (born 5 January 1988) is a Malaysian professional track cyclist. Nicknamed "The Pocket Rocketman" due to his small stature, he is the first and the only Malaysian cyclist to win a medal at the Summer Olympics.

Azizulhasni was Team Malaysia's national flag bearer at the 2008 Summer Olympics Parade of Nations. He won his first World Championship medal in 2009, a silver in the individual sprint. 
His debut Olympic medal came at the 2016 Summer Olympics, a bronze in the individual keirin.
In the 2020 Tokyo Olympics, he won a silver medal in the same category of individual keirin.

In 2017, he won his first World Championship title in the keirin, and became the first Malaysian to ever wear the coveted rainbow jersey.

Early life and education
Azizulhasni was born in Dungun, Terengganu, Malaysia to his biological parent Awang Embong and Rokiah Husin. He is the eighth of nine children in his family and was adopted by Mustafa Ngah and Selamiah Yong. Azizul took up cycling at 10 years old before he was discovered by his first coach Rozimi Omar who had advised him to stop skateboarding and focus on cycling. He was thankful to his late father for giving him a bicycle as a reward after he obtained 4A 1B in his UPSR. Azizul received his primary education at Sekolah Kebangsaan Batu 48 and continued his secondary studies at the Sekolah Menengah Kebangsaan Sultan Omar in Dungun. After his PMR examination, he received three offers from MRSM, Science School and the Bukit Jalil Sports School. Ultimately chose to transfer to national sport school in Bukit Jalil  as his interest in cycling and also due to his ambition to be a physician or an athlete at that time.

Azizul is majoring in sports science (Bachelor of Sport Movement) at Victoria University in Melbourne, Australia. In 2015, he became the first non-Australian athlete to receive a Blue Award from Victoria University.

Career
Azizulhasni's greatest achievement is winning the gold medal in 2017 UCI Track Cycling World Championships and silver medal in the 2020 Olympics in Tokyo in keirin. Among his other achievements is winning the silver medal at the 2009 World Championships in the sprint category and the silver medal at the 2010 World Championships in the keirin category. He was named Malaysian Sportsman of the Year in 2009 and 2010.

In February 2011, Azizul was involved in a crash during the final of the keirin event in the World Cup leg in Manchester where he suffered serious injury when a 20 cm wooden splinter pierced through his leg. He was ruled out of the World Championships that year.

At the 2017 Southeast Asian Games Azizul was the 111th gold medal winner, achieving Malaysia's gold medal goal after emerging champion in the men's sprint category at the National Velodrome in Nilai. Azizul was also the flag-bearer for Malaysia at the 2017 Southeast Asian Games alongside diver Cheong Jun Hoong and silat exponent Mohd Al-Jufferi Jamari.

Personal life
Dato' Azizul married To' Puan Athiah Ilyana Abd Samat on 30 January 2010. The couple lives in Melbourne with their two daughters.

Achievements
 Track Cycling World Ranking
 2008/09 – 1st Keirin
 2010/11 – 1st Keirin

World Championships
2009 –  Sprint
2010 –  Keirin
2015 –  Keirin
2016 –  Keirin
2017 –   Keirin
2020 –  Keirin
2020 –  Sprint

Asian Games
2010 –  Keirin
2018 –  Sprint
2018 –  Team sprint
2018 –  Keirin

Commonwealth Games
2010 –  Team sprint (with Josiah Ng and Mohd Rizal Tisin)
2014 –  Keirin

Olympic Games
2016 –  Keirin
2020 –  Keirin

Awards and achievements
Sportswriters Association of Malaysia (SAM)-100Plus Best Athlete Award: 2009, 2017

Honours

Honours of Malaysia
  :
  Officer of the Order of the Defender of the Realm (KMN) (2017)
  Member of the Order of the Defender of the Realm (AMN) (2016)
  :
  Knight Commander of the Order of the Crown of Terengganu (DPMT) – Dato' (2021)

References

External links

1988 births
Living people
People from Terengganu
Malaysian people of Malay descent
Malaysian Muslims
Malaysian expatriates in Australia
Malaysian male cyclists
Malaysian track cyclists
UCI Track Cycling World Champions (men)
Olympic cyclists of Malaysia
Olympic silver medalists for Malaysia
Olympic bronze medalists for Malaysia
Olympic medalists in cycling
Medalists at the 2016 Summer Olympics
Medalists at the 2020 Summer Olympics
Cyclists at the 2008 Summer Olympics
Cyclists at the 2012 Summer Olympics
Cyclists at the 2016 Summer Olympics
Cyclists at the 2020 Summer Olympics
Asian Games medalists in cycling
Medalists at the 2010 Asian Games
Medalists at the 2018 Asian Games
Asian Games gold medalists for Malaysia
Asian Games silver medalists for Malaysia
Asian Games bronze medalists for Malaysia
Cyclists at the 2010 Asian Games
Cyclists at the 2014 Asian Games
Cyclists at the 2018 Asian Games
Commonwealth Games medallists in cycling
Commonwealth Games bronze medallists for Malaysia
Cyclists at the 2010 Commonwealth Games
Cyclists at the 2014 Commonwealth Games
Cyclists at the 2018 Commonwealth Games
Southeast Asian Games medalists in cycling
Southeast Asian Games gold medalists for Malaysia
Southeast Asian Games silver medalists for Malaysia
Competitors at the 2007 Southeast Asian Games
Competitors at the 2017 Southeast Asian Games
Victoria University, Melbourne alumni
Members of the Order of the Defender of the Realm
Officers of the Order of the Defender of the Realm
Knights Commander of the Order of the Crown of Terengganu
Medallists at the 2010 Commonwealth Games